Qiyaslı (also, Kiyasly) is a village and municipality in the Samukh Rayon of Azerbaijan.  It has a population of 481.

References 

Populated places in Samukh District